Campiglossa malaris is a species of fruit fly in the family Tephritidae.

Distribution
The species is found in the United Kingdom, the Netherlands, Belgium, France, Switzerland.

References

Tephritinae
Insects described in 1934
Diptera of Europe